One Step at a Time is the eighteenth studio album by the American country music singer George Strait, released in 1998 on MCA Nashville Records. The album produced the singles "I Just Want to Dance with You", "True", and "We Really Shouldn't Be Doing This", which respectively reached No. 1, No. 2, and No. 4 on the Billboard Hot Country Singles & Tracks (now Hot Country Songs) charts in 1998.

Track listing

Personnel
Eddie Bayers – drums
Stuart Duncan – fiddle
Paul Franklin – steel guitar, pedabro
Steve Gibson – electric guitar, acoustic guitar
Liana Manis – background vocals
Brent Mason – electric guitar, gut string guitar, acoustic guitar
Steve Nathan – piano, synthesizers, Wurlitzer electric piano, accordion
George Strait – lead vocals
Biff Watson – acoustic guitar, high third guitar
Glenn Worf – bass guitar, upright bass
Curtis Young – background vocals

Charts

Weekly charts

Year-end charts

References

1998 albums
George Strait albums
MCA Records albums
Albums produced by Tony Brown (record producer)